Kris Pope (born 25 May 1976) is a Canadian film and television actor.

Early life
He was born in Calgary, Alberta, and raised in Vancouver, British Columbia, with a younger sister Carly Pope – who became an actress – and a younger brother. Pope is of one-half Italian, one-quarter Yugoslav, and one-quarter Irish heritage.

Career
Pope has appeared in at least six films and also appeared in over a dozen television productions.

Film and television work

 Breaker High (one episode, "New Kids on the Deck"; 1998) as Cute Guy
 Shutterspeed (2000) (television film) as Mark Pearson
 Josie and the Pussycats (2001) as Gregor
 Dark Angel (three episodes, "Meow 01x20; 2001", "Radar Love 02x04" and "Boo 02x05"; 2002) as Rafer
 My Guide to Becoming a Rock Star (one episode, "Pilot"; 2002)
 Saint Sinner (2002) (television film) as Brother Rafael
 Snow Queen (2002) (television film) as Reginald Priceless
 House of the Dead (2003) as Raver
 John Doe (two episodes, "Tone Dead" and "Doe or Die"; 2003) as Funky Coroner's Assistant; Coroner's Assistant
 Smallville (one episode, "Visitor", 2003) as Todd
 Thanksgiving Family Reunion (2003) (television film) as Jock No. 2
 Going the Distance (2004) as Rowdy Guy
 Break a Leg, Rosie (2005)
 Killer Instinct (one episode, "Forget Me Not"; 2005)
 Bionic Woman (one episode, "Faceoff"; 2007) as Other Sexy Poker Guy
 Elegy (2008) as Consuela's Brother
 The L Word (two episodes, "Lacuna" (2005) and "Lifecycle", (2008)) as Emile; Cycling Dude No. 1
 Yeti: Curse of the Snow Demon (2008) (television film) as Rafael Garcia
 The Break-Up Artist (2009) as Pat

Personal life
On 29 December 2009, Pope and his sister were driving a black BMW vehicle down West Georgia Street in Downtown Vancouver when David Fromradas, age 31 of Alberta, jumped on top of the car and yelled at them to run him over. When Pope got out of the car, Fromradas jumped in the front seat and drove the vehicle into the new CBC studios. Pope suffered severe injuries to his ankle; his sister suffered a broken rib and two cracked vertebrae.  The two, along with an unidentified victim, were treated at hospital; Fromradas was also treated in hospital and remained in police custody.

References

External links
 

1976 births
Living people
Male actors from Calgary
Male actors from Vancouver
Canadian male film actors
Canadian people of Irish descent
Canadian people of Italian descent
Canadian people of Yugoslav descent
Canadian male television actors